The Penn-Trafford School District is a public school district that serves western Westmoreland County, Pennsylvania and a small portion of Allegheny County, Pennsylvania.  The district is governed by a locally elected, nine member school board who serve, staggered four-year terms, the Pennsylvania General Assembly and the Pennsylvania Department of Education. The district neighbors 7 other school districts:  Franklin Regional, Greensburg-Salem, Hempfield Area, Jeannette City, Norwin, Gateway, and East Allegheny.  The district mascot is the Warrior.

The Suburban Pittsburgh district serves the municipalities of Trafford, Penn, Penn Township, Manor, and Harrison City.

Schools
 Elementary (K-5)
 McCullough Elementary
 Level Green Elementary
 Sunrise Estates Elementary
 Trafford Elementary
 Harrison Park Elementary
 Middle (6-8)
 Penn Middle
 Trafford Middle
 High School (9-12)
 Penn-Trafford High School

The Penn-Trafford School District is the public school system of the following County entities; Penn Township, Trafford Borough, Penn Borough, and parts of Manor Borough.  All areas of the Penn-Trafford School District are in Westmoreland County except for a small area of Trafford Borough that is part of Allegheny County.

Penn-Trafford grew out of the Penn Joint school system that was formed in 1951 when Penn Township and Penn Borough formed a partnership.  In 1956 Trafford Borough became a third party to form a district administrative unit under the County Plan for the Reorganization of School Districts, however all three areas retained their own identity in the joint school system. In 1963 Manor Borough annexed part of Penn Township but the annexed area remained within the Penn Joint school system. In the meantime plans for a full merger of Penn Joint and Trafford were initiated in 1961 and were finalized in 1965 when the Commonwealth of Pennsylvania approved the Penn-Trafford School District as Administrative Unit XV of the Westmoreland County Plan.

Penn Middle School and Trafford Middle School are the previous high schools before the school districts joined.  Trafford Middle's boundaries now include a large area of Penn Township to roughly equalize the school sizes of the two middle schools.

References

External links
 Official Website
 Penn-Trafford Star Newspaper
 http://www.usaweekend.com/hsm/showstopper-award-high-schools-08.html
 http://www.schooldigger.com/go/PA/schools/1866006648/school.aspx

School districts in Westmoreland County, Pennsylvania
School districts in Allegheny County, Pennsylvania
Education in Pittsburgh area